Gabriel Jean-Edouard Koyambounou (born 1947) is a Central African politician who was Prime Minister of the Central African Republic from 12 April 1995 to 6 June 1996. He is currently the First Vice-President of the Movement for the Liberation of the Central African People (MLPC).

Koyambounou was acquitted of misuse of public funds on 6 December 2004. After MLPC First Vice-President Luc Dondon Apollinaire Konamabaye was suspended from his duties, Koyambounou, who was Second Vice-President, took over as First Vice-President in an interim capacity in January 2006.

References

1947 births
Living people
Prime Ministers of the Central African Republic
Movement for the Liberation of the Central African People politicians